Decaprenyl-phosphate phosphoribosyltransferase (5-phospho-alpha-D-ribose-1-diphosphate:decaprenyl-phosphate 5-phosphoribosyltransferase, 5-phospho-alpha-D-ribose 1-pyrophosphate:decaprenyl phosphate 5-phosphoribosyltransferase, DPPR synthase, Rv3806) is an enzyme with systematic name trans,octacis-decaprenylphospho-beta-D-ribofuranose 5-phosphate:diphosphate phospho-alpha-D-ribosyltransferase. This enzyme catalyses the following chemical reaction

 trans,octacis-decaprenyl phosphate + 5-phospho-alpha-D-ribose 1-diphosphate  trans,octacis-decaprenylphospho-beta-D-ribofuranose 5-phosphate + diphosphate

This enzyme requires Mg2+. It is isolated from Mycobacterium tuberculosis.

References

External links 
 

EC 2.4.2